Shiranui (lit. "unknown fire") is a Japanese term given to the optical or supernatural phenomenon similar to will-o'-the-wisp; see shiranui.
It is also a name associated with:

People
, sumo wrestler, the 8th Yokozuna
, sumo wrestler, the 11th Yokozuna
, sumo wrestler known by the elder name Shiranui

Characters
, a character in Fatal Fury and the King of Fighters series
, one of the Konoha Jonin characters in the anime Naruto
Shiranui (白野威), the wolf incarnation of Amaterasu in Ōkami (however, in this case the kanji means "white wild majesty")
, a character in the Samurai Shodown/Samurai Spirits video game series
, A kitten in the protection of Nagi Sanzenin in the Hayate the Combat Butler series
Shiranui, a fictional mountain and shrine in The Thousand Autumns of Jacob de Zoet
, a character in the otome game Hakuōki Shinsengumi Kitan
, a character in the Medaka Box

Other
Japanese destroyer Shiranui, list of Imperial Japanese Navy destroyers named Shiranui
Shiranui DDT a professional wrestling move invented by Naomichi Marufuji
a variety of citrus fruit, known also as Dekopon
Shiranui-ryū, a school of Japanese martial arts.
Shiranui, the second awakening of the Kunoichi subclass of the Thief in Dungeon Fighter Online
Shiranui, a sword given from father to son in a samurai family that is briefly mentioned in the manga Angel Sanctuary
Shiranui, an archetype in the card game Yu-Gi-Oh!, featuring FIRE type zombies with zero DEF
Shiranui, a katana with little or no augments, appears in Final Fantasy X
Genjutsu Shiranui, a jutsu used by Itachi Uchiha in Naruto: Ultimate Ninja  series
Shiranui Sea, a bay (also known as Yatsushiro Sea) south of Ariake Bay in Kyushu, Japan
Shiranui, one of two "dohyo-iri" types in sumo wrestling that are performed by Yokozuna (grand champions)
Shiranui, a sub-archetype of the Nubatama clan in Cardfight!! Vanguard focusing on controlling the opponents rearguards.
A 3rd generation TSF (Mecha) which appears in the Muv-Luv visual novel universe, developed by the Imperial Japanese Forces

Japanese-language surnames
Japanese words and phrases